Deh Now-ye Kenar Gusheh (also Romanized as Deh Now-ye Kenār Gūsheh) is a village in Kenevist Rural District, in the Central District of Mashhad County, Razavi Khorasan Province, Iran. At the 2006 census, its population was 48, in 12 families.

References 

Populated places in Mashhad County